The Expedition to Canton was a British punitive expedition that captured the forts along the Pearl River, Guangdong province, China, on 2–3 April 1847. Beginning at the Humen Strait (Bogue), the British captured the forts leading up to the city of Canton (Guangzhou). The operation was in response to British subjects being attacked by the Chinese near Canton. Hong Kong Governor John Davis demanded redress from Chinese Commissioner Keying.

Unsatisfied with his reply, Davis ordered Major-General George D'Aguilar, the commander-in-chief of British forces in China, to seize the forts approaching Canton and to prepare for an attack on the city to force reparations on the spot. The forts were captured, but Canton was spared after Keying agreed to punish the culprits and to allow entry into the city.

Operations 
On the afternoon of 1 April 1847, D'Aguilar received communication from Davis with orders to proceed to Canton with force. At midnight, the following forces were embarked:
HMS Vulture – 427 troops, 18th Royal Irish Regiment
HMS Espiegle – 149 troops, 42nd Regiment Madras Native Infantry
East India Company steamer Pluto – 280 troops, 42nd Regiment
Hired armed steamer Corsair – 110 troops, 18th Regiment
Hired lorcha No. 1 – Armed as a gunboat, detachment of Royal Artillery with ordnance stores
Hired lorcha No. 2 – Detachment of Royal Sappers and Miners with tools, scaling ladders, and other materials

British operations began with the capture of the Bogue forts. Listed are the number of ordnance captured at each site:
Anunghoy Island – 208
North Wangtong Island – 150
South Wangtong Island – 109

Further up the Canton River past Whampoa Island, the British encountered a staked barrier and captured the following locations:
Pachow Fort – 64
Wookongtap Fort – 41
Napier's Island – 49
Whampoa Creek – 65

In the final phase, the British captured the forts outside the city of Canton:
French Folly – 38
Dutch Folly – 23
Rogue Fort – 26
Zigzag Battery – 20
Segment Battery – 30
Shameen Battery – 56

Gallery

References

Further reading 

The Chinese Repository. Volume 16. Canton. 1847. pp. 182–203, 252–265.
"Colonial News: China". The Maitland Mercury and Hunter River General Advertiser 5 (312): 4. 26 June 1847. Retrieved 15 June 2016.

1847 in China
April 1847 events
Battles involving the Qing dynasty
Battles involving the United Kingdom
China–United Kingdom relations
Conflicts in 1847
Foreign relations of the Qing dynasty
Military history of Guangzhou
Punitive expeditions of the United Kingdom